The 1998 Triple J Hottest 100, announced in January, 1999, was the sixth such countdown of the most popular songs of the year, according to listeners of the Australian radio station Triple J. As in previous years, a CD featuring 36 of the songs was released. In August 1998 a Hottest 100 of All Time was conducted separate to normal countdown.

In February 2019, Triple J's sister station Double J conducted a 're-vote' of the 1998 top 10.

Full list

42 of the 100 songs were by Australian artists (marked with a green background).

Artists with multiple entries
Six entries
Quan Yeomans (Four with Regurgitator and two with Happyland) (6, 26, 27, 28, 32, 71)
Four entries
Regurgitator (6, 26, 27, 32)
Three entries
Jebediah (7, 42, 91)
The Living End (10, 15, 17)
Grinspoon (18, 22, 79)
The Whitlams (37, 43, 56)
Pearl Jam (47, 51, 88)
Garbage (57, 87, 89)
Two entries
The Offspring (1, 62)
Custard (3, 24)
Hole (4, 49)
Powderfinger (8, 46)
You Am I (9, 65)
Ben Folds Five (12, 40)
Chef (20, 90)
Marcy Playground (21, 76)
Happyland (28, 71)
The Smashing Pumpkins (45, 94)
Green Day (52, 84)
Frenzal Rhomb (54, 72)
Metallica (67, 77)
Foo Fighters (74, 98)
The Superjesus (83, 99)

CD release

This was the last volume to be released on cassette.

A later release omits "Never There", "Got the Life", "Sweetest Thing", "Brick", "Don't You Know Who I Am", and "Everybody Here Wants You", while including "If You Tolerate This Your Children Will Be Next" by Manic Street Preachers, "Untouchable Face" by Ani DiFranco, and Something for Kate's cover of "Harpoon".

Certifications

See also
1998 in music

References

External links
  Triple J Hottest 100 History

1998
1998 in Australian music
1998 record charts